Koojan  is a small town located between Moora and Bindoon in the Wheatbelt region of Western Australia.

When the Midland railway was opened in 1894 the site of the present town was established as a railway siding. Some time afterward the area was surveyed and subdivided and the town was gazetted in 1910.

The town is named after the Aboriginal word for a nearby pool of the Moore River. The name was first recorded on maps which were surveyed in 1861 but the meaning of the word is unknown.

References 

Wheatbelt (Western Australia)
Towns in Western Australia
1894 establishments in Australia